Meg the Lady is a 1916 British silent crime film directed by Maurice Elvey and starring Elisabeth Risdon, Fred Groves and Eric Stuart. The film is based on the 1905 novel of the same name by Tom Gallon.

Cast
 Elisabeth Risdon as Lady Brisby  
 Fred Groves as Giles Curwen  
 Eric Stuart as Teddy

References

Bibliography
 Goble, Alan. The Complete Index to Literary Sources in Film. Walter de Gruyter, 1999.

External links
 

1916 films
British crime films
British silent feature films
1910s English-language films
Films directed by Maurice Elvey
1916 crime films
Films based on British novels
Films set in England
British black-and-white films
1910s British films